Rustico Torrecampo (born 1 August 1972 in Davao City, Philippines) is a retired Filipino professional boxer notable for being the first fighter to defeat Manny Pacquiao.

Personal life
Torrecampo is the fifth of eight siblings and is a high school drop-out, completing just his freshman year. His father, Escolastico Torrecampo, Sr., was killed by New People's Army guerrillas in Davao City in 1985.  Torrecampo is married to Cecille Camposano; they have three children, Ruscel Carl, Carisa Rose and Rich Cymoun. He lived with his extended family in Tondo, Manila.

After retiring from boxing, Torrecampo worked at a factory in Quezon City. In 2006, he quit the job and became an ambulant vendor, selling food out of a bicycle cart in Tondo. In 2007, he was wanted for murder in the stabbing death of a garbage truck driver who allegedly hit his food cart, spilling his wares onto the street. In 2011, Torrecampo was out on bail pending court hearings to resolve his case.

Professional boxing career
Torrecampo fought in the light flyweight division from 1993-1997 and retired with 14 wins, 8 losses and 5 draws. On 9 February 1996, he fought Manny Pacquiao, who at that time held an 11-win, 0-loss record, in Mandaluyong, Manila. Pacquiao failed to make weight and was penalized by being made to wear eight-ounce gloves; Torrecampo wore six-ounce gloves. Torrecampo controlled the first two rounds and knocked out Pacquiao in the third round with a overhand left to the jaw as Pacquiao was coming in.

A month after his victory over Pacquiao, Torrecampo broke his left wrist during another boxing match; he never went to a doctor for treatment. He retired in 1997; the improperly-healed fracture leaving a small bone sticking out of his left wrist. Torrecampo's biggest paycheck was a Php 30,000.00 purse for a fight in either Thailand or South Korea. His purse from the Pacquiao fight earned him Php 6,500.00 and his largest local paycheck was Php 17,000.00 for a bout he lost in General Santos.

Return to professional boxing
In 2011, Torrecampo came out of retirement after 14 years. He won his first comeback fight against a younger opponent via a third-round knockout.

Professional boxing record 

|-
| style="text-align:center;" colspan="8"|15 Wins (8 knockouts), 8 Loss, 6 draws
|-  style="text-align:center; background:#e3e3e3;"
|  style="border-style:none none solid solid; "|Res.
|  style="border-style:none none solid solid; "|Record
|  style="border-style:none none solid solid; "|Opponent
|  style="border-style:none none solid solid; "|Type
|  style="border-style:none none solid solid; "|RoundTime
|  style="border-style:none none solid solid; "|Date
|  style="border-style:none none solid solid; "|Location
|  style="border-style:none none solid solid; "|Notes
|- align=center
|Win||15–8–6||align=left| Jovanie Bualan
|
|
|
|align=left|
|align=left|
|- align=center
|Loss||14–8–6||align=left| Archie Villamor
|
|
|
|align=left|
|align=left|
|- align=center
|Draw||14–7–6||align=left| Jaime Aliguin
|
|
|
|align=left|
|align=left|
|- align=center
|Loss||14–7–5||align=left| Alpong Navaja
|
|
|
|align=left|
|align=left|
|- align=center
|Loss||14–6–5||align=left| Yong-Soon Chang
|
|
|
|align=left|
|align=left|
|- align=center
|Win||14–5–5||align=left| Noel Tunacao
|
|
|
|align=left|
|align=left|
|- align=center
|Loss||13–5–5||align=left| Leo Ramirez
|
|
|
|align=left|
|align=left|
|- align=center
|Win||13–4–5||align=left| Ricky Sales
|
|
|
|align=left|
|align=left|
|- align=center
|Win||12–4–5||align=left| Manny Pacquiao
|
|
|
|align=left|
|align=left|
|- align=center
|Win||11–4–5||align=left| Nick Caintoy
|
|
|
|align=left|
|align=left|
|- align=center
|Loss||10–4–5||align=left| Ritichai Kiatprapas
|
|
|
|align=left|
|align=left|
|- align=center
|Win||10–3–5||align=left| Reynante Rojo
|
|
|
|align=left|
|align=left|
|- align=center
|Draw||9–3–5||align=left| Alpong Navaja
|
|
|
|align=left|
|align=left|
|- align=center
|Draw||9–3–4||align=left| Nathan Barcelona
|
|
|
|align=left|
|align=left|
|- align=center
|Win||9–3–3||align=left| Marvin Corpuz
|
|
|
|align=left|
|align=left|
|- align=center
|Draw||8–3–3||align=left| Rodel Magallanes
|
|
|
|align=left|
|align=left|
|- align=center
|Win||8–3–2||align=left| Chris Galon
|
|
|
|align=left|
|align=left|
|- align=center
|Win||7–3–2||align=left| Mario Sajulan
|
|
|
|align=left|
|align=left|
|- align=center
|Win||6–3–2||align=left| Rodel Magallanes
|
|
|
|align=left|
|align=left|
|- align=center
|Loss||5–3–2||align=left| Edmund Villamor
|
|
|
|align=left|
|align=left|
|- align=center
|Draw||5–2–2||align=left| Jun Jun Tomagan
|
|
|
|align=left|
|align=left|
|- align=center
|Loss||5–2–1||align=left| Ramie Navarrete
|
|
|
|align=left|
|align=left|
|- align=center
|Win||5–1–1||align=left| Jun Jun Tomagan
|
|
|
|align=left|
|align=left|
|- align=center
|Win||4–1–1||align=left| Baby Lorona Jr
|
|
|
|align=left|
|align=left|
|- align=center
|Win||3–1–1||align=left| Bernardo Jun Davalos
|
|
|
|align=left|
|align=left|
|- align=center
|Win||2–1–1||align=left| Jun Jun Tomagan
|
|
|
|align=left|
|align=left|
|- align=center
|Win||1–1–1||align=left| Manuel Andales
|
|
|
|align=left|
|align=left|
|- align=center
|Loss||0–1–1||align=left| Ramie Navarrete
|
|
|
|align=left|
|align=left|
|- align=center
|Draw||0–0–1||align=left| Julie Tagalog
|
|
|
|align=left|
|align=left|

References

1972 births
Bantamweight boxers
Flyweight boxers
Living people
Filipino male boxers
Sportspeople from Davao City
Boxers from Davao del Sur